Parliamentary elections were held in Kiribati on 29 November 2002, with a second round on 8 December. The result was a victory for the new Pillars of Truth party, which won 17 of the 40 seats in the House of Assembly. Fourteen MPs, including seven cabinet ministers lost their seats in the election.

Campaign
A total of 176 candidates contested the election, with over half running under the banner of the ruling Protect the Maneaba party.

A bitter election campaign included opposition leader Harry Tong accusing the government of attempting to prevent him using the national coat of arms on his campaign material, which also claiming that Chinese government officials were attempting to bribe candidates. In response, the ruling party accused the opposition of siding with Taiwan.

Results

Aftermath
Following the election, three independents allied with the Pillars of Truth. The new MPs were sworn in on 9 January 2003.

References

Kiribati
Elections in Kiribati
2002 in Kiribati
Election and referendum articles with incomplete results